Adiphenine is an inhibitor of nicotinic receptors.

Pharmacology and Biochemistry

See also
Dicycloverine

References

Carboxylate esters
Diethylamino compounds